The Film and TV Charity, formerly the CTBF (Cinema and Television Benevolent Fund), is the leading UK charity for people who work in the film, cinema and television industries, whose careers cover all aspects of pre-production and beyond, from script to screen and in a variety of roles.

Operating out of its main office in London, their services are available across the whole of the UK.

The charity owns the trademark for the Royal Film Performance, an event that has previously been attended by HM The Queen or other members of the British Royal Family. The most recent Royal Film Performance was in 2022 for the UK premiere of Top Gun: Maverick and was attended by Prince William, and the Duchess of Cambridge.

The charity runs a 24/7 Support Line. The support line is available to discuss legal queries, mental health and wellbeing, financial troubles, family issues, or bullying and discrimination.

Campaigns

Better Mental Health/Looking Glass Survey 
In 2019, the charity launched the Looking Glass Survey to explore the mental health conditions of the UK Film and TV industry. The results of this survey led the charity to create the Whole Picture Programme.

In 2021, the charity ran the Looking Glass Survey again and it showed there were still major problems within the industry in relation to work strain, bullying & harassment and Mental Health.

In 2022, the charity launched the third iteration of the Looking Glass Survey to measure the progress of work being done to tackle the Mental Health crisis facing the industry.

Diversity, Equity and Inclusion 
In 2020, the charity added a new goal to their mission. As part of this process, the charity published two written reports focusing on racism in the industry.

Let's Reset 
In 2021, the charity launched a year-long campaign titled "Let's Reset", supported by various major studios, production companies and industry bodies:

Patrons 
Currently, the charity's Patron is HM the Queen.

Vice-patrons 
Anne Bennett, Debbie Chalet, Derek Cooper, Stan Fishman CBE, Sir Paul Fox CBE, Lord Grade CBE, Stephen Jaggs, Barry Jenkins OBE, Ian Lewis, David McCall CBE, David Murrell, Sir Alan Parker CBE, Denise Parkinson, Lord Puttnam CBE, Jeremy Thomas CBE, Michael G. Wilson OBE.

References

Sources

External links

Social welfare charities based in the United Kingdom
Television organisations in the United Kingdom
Film organisations in the United Kingdom
Mental health organisations in the United Kingdom